Edwards Town Hall is a historic town hall building located at Edwards in St. Lawrence County, New York. It was built in 1896 and is a two-story, rectangular brick building, 43 feet wide and 79 feet long.  It features a prominent square tower and central gable.

It was listed on the National Register of Historic Places in 2004.

References

City and town halls on the National Register of Historic Places in New York (state)
Government buildings completed in 1896
Buildings and structures in St. Lawrence County, New York
National Register of Historic Places in St. Lawrence County, New York
1896 establishments in New York (state)